Lawrence G. Rawl (May 4, 1928 – February 14, 2005) was an American businessman, the chairman and CEO of Exxon from 1985 to 1993.

Early life
Rawl was born in Lyndhurst, New Jersey in 1928.  Toward the end of World War II, he enlisted and served in the U.S. Marine Corps. In 1952, he graduated with a bachelor's degree in petroleum engineering from the University of Oklahoma, joining Humble Oil and Refining as drilling engineer.

Career
By 1980, he was named a senior vice president and director of Exxon Corporation.  In 1985, he was named president of the corporation; and in 1987, he became chairman and CEO, taking over from Clifton C. Garvin.  During his tenure as head of Exxon, he moved the corporate headquarters from New York to Irving, Texas, increased reserves, and expanded the chemical operations of the corporation.

He was at the helm of the company when the Exxon Valdez oil spill occurred in 1989.  He faced criticism for his response to the oil spill — his slow public response and his demeanor in interviews were noted and the focus of criticism of the company.

Rawl retired from Exxon in 1993 at the mandatory retirement age of 65 after 41 years with the company.
He was succeeded by Lee Raymond as CEO of the company.

Personal life
He died at age 76 on February 13, 2005, at his home in Fort Worth, Texas.

Notes

References

1928 births
2005 deaths
American chief executives
United States Marine Corps personnel of World War II
ExxonMobil people
People from Lyndhurst, New Jersey
People from Fort Worth, Texas
United States Marines
University of Oklahoma alumni